Epney is a small village on the River Severn. It is  South-West of Gloucester, Gloucestershire, England within the parish of Longney and Epney. It is between Longney and Upper Framilode. The village has a pub called The Anchor Inn. The population of the Longney and Epney parish is 285 (2011).

The hamlet of Epney was first inhabited by the late 13th century, Originally part of the Moreton Valence Parish and has been part of the Framilode ecclesiastical parish since 1855. Since 1974 Epney has been part of the civil parish of Longney and Epney.

The small house known as Doris' Cottage dates from the 15th century and is designated as a Grade II* listed building.

References

Stroud District
Villages in Gloucestershire